Kasper Kusk Vangsgaard (born 10 November 1991) is a Danish professional footballer who plays as a winger for Danish Superliga club Silkeborg IF.

He is the son of former AaB manager and player Søren Kusk.

Career

AaB 
Having spent the earliest part of his career at local club Gug Boldklub he moved to AaB at the age of 14.

He made his first team league debut for AaB in a 2–0 home loss against Esbjerg fB on 21 August 2010, coming on as a substitute in the 80th minute. His breakthrough into the AaB starting eleven came in the spring of 2012, where he made 11 appearances and scoring 1 goal.

His good form in the 2012–13 season was rewarded with an extension of his contract, a call-up to the Danish national team and interest from European clubs, including Crystal Palace, Anderlecht and Lille.

He was voted as the league profile of the fall 2013 in the Danish Superliga by the league's managers.

in May 2014, Kusk and AaB won the Danish Superliga and the Danish Cup. Kusk scored 12 goals and created 8 assists in the league.

Twente 
On 10 June 2014, it was confirmed by the president of FC Twente, Joop Munsterman, that the club was discussing a transfer of Kusk.

Copenhagen 
On 14 May 2015, it was confirmed that Kusk returned to the Danish Superliga, as he signed a five-year contract with F.C. Copenhagen.

Return to AaB
On 31 January 2018, Kusk returned to AaB.

Silkeborg
On 31 August 2022, Kusk joined Silkeborg IF on a deal until June 2024.

Honours 
AaB
Danish Superliga: 2013–14
Danish Cup: 2013–14

Copenhagen
Danish Superliga: 2015–16, 2016–17
Danish Cup: 2015–16, 2016–17

References

External links 

1991 births
Living people
Sportspeople from Aalborg
Danish men's footballers
Association football midfielders
Denmark international footballers
Denmark under-21 international footballers
Denmark youth international footballers
Danish Superliga players
Eredivisie players
AaB Fodbold players
F.C. Copenhagen players
FC Twente players
Jong FC Twente players
Silkeborg IF players
Danish expatriate men's footballers
Danish expatriate sportspeople in the Netherlands
Expatriate footballers in the Netherlands